Afraflacilla is a genus of the spider family Salticidae (jumping spiders). Most species are distributed in Eastern to Northern Africa (including the Middle East) and Australia, with two species (A. epiblemoides and A. tarajalis) found in Europe. This genus was for a time included in the genus Pseudicius, and the boundaries between both genera are disputed. In 2016 Jerzy Prószyński erected the genus Psenuc for some borderline species. The name Afraflacilla is combined from Africa, where most earlier described species were found, and Flacilla Simon, 1901, an obsolete salticid genus now called Flacillula Strand, 1932. This genus name is in turn derived from Aelia Flaccilla, wife of Roman Emperor Theodosius I. Afraflacilla, Pseudicius, Festucula and Marchena are close relatives and form a monophyletic group.

Afraflacilla species have tubercles and bristles (on the sides of the carapace near the eyes and on their legs) which they rub together to make sounds used in courtship and possibly defence. The line of small tubercles (sharp knobs) under the eyes on the side of the carapace are usually visible to the naked eye.

Afraflacilla in Australia 
Afraflacilla species in Australia include A. grayorum, A. gunbar, A. huntorum, A. milledgei, A. stridulator, A. vestjensi and A. yeni. In Australia they occupy tree trunks in deserts, savanna woodland and in open sclerophyll forests from south west Western Australia to Cape York Queensland, mostly in warmer regions. There are many undescribed Australian species. Afraflacilla grayorum Grays' stridulating jumping spider, found in northern Australian deserts, was named in honour of Michael and Greta Gray.

The male palpal organ of many Australian Afraflacilla species has a large, circling embolus (inseminating sclerite) and retro-lateral tibial apophysis (side spike). Some undescribed Australian Afraflacilla species have greatly enlarged segments of the first pair of legs, and sometimes massive spurs coming from underneath the tibia and metatarsus (third and second last leg segments). Enlarged leg-one segments are also a feature of Pseudicius, a genus widespread outside Australia.

Species

, the World Spider Catalog accepted the following species:

 Afraflacilla altera (Wesołowska, 2000) – Zimbabwe, South Africa
 Afraflacilla antineae (Denis, 1954) – Algeria
 Afraflacilla arabica Wesołowska & van Harten, 1994 – Egypt, Yemen, Iran, Afghanistan
 Afraflacilla asorotica (Simon, 1890) – Saudi Arabia, Israel, Yemen
 Afraflacilla ballarini Cao & Li, 2016 – China
 Afraflacilla bamakoi Berland & Millot, 1941 – Mali
 Afraflacilla banni Prajapati, Tatu & Kamboj, 2021 – India
 Afraflacilla berlandi Denis, 1955 – Libya
 Afraflacilla bipunctata (G. W. Peckham & E. G. Peckham, 1903) – South Africa
 Afraflacilla braunsi (G. W. Peckham & E. G. Peckham, 1903) – South Africa, Saudi Arabia, Yemen, United Arab Emirates, Turkmenistan
 Afraflacilla datuntata (Logunov & Zamanpoore, 2005) – Afghanistan
 Afraflacilla elegans (Wesołowska & Cumming, 2008) - Zimbabwe, South Africa
 Afraflacilla epiblemoides (Chyzer, 1891) – Central, Eastern Europe, Turkey, Armenia
 Afraflacilla eximia (Wesołowska & Russell-Smith, 2000) – Tanzania
 Afraflacilla fayda (Wesołowska & van Harten, 2010) – United Arab Emirates
 Afraflacilla flavipes (Caporiacco, 1935) – Turkmenistan, Pakistan
 Afraflacilla grayorum Żabka, 1993 – Western Australia, Queensland
 Afraflacilla gunbar Żabka & Gray, 2002 – New South Wales
 Afraflacilla histrionica (Simon, 1902) – South Africa
 Afraflacilla huntorum Żabka, 1993 – Western Australia, Victoria
 Afraflacilla imitator (Wesołowska & Haddad, 2013) – South Africa
 Afraflacilla javanica (Prószyński & Deeleman-Reinhold, 2012) – Java
 Afraflacilla karinae (Haddad & Wesołowska, 2011) – South Africa
 Afraflacilla kraussi (Marples, 1964) – Marshall Is., Cook Is., Samoa
 Afraflacilla mikhailovi (Prószyński, 2000) – Israel
 Afraflacilla mushrif (Wesołowska & van Harten, 2010) – Israel
 Afraflacilla philippinensis (Prószyński, 1992) – Philippines
 Afraflacilla refulgens (Wesołowska & Cumming, 2008) – Zimbabwe
 Afraflacilla reiskindi (Prószyński, 1992) – Borneo
 Afraflacilla risbeci Berland & Millot, 1941 – Senegal
 Afraflacilla roberti (Wesołowska, 2011) – Kenya
 Afraflacilla scenica Denis, 1955 – Niger
 Afraflacilla similis Berland & Millot, 1941 – Senegal
 Afraflacilla spiniger (O. Pickard-Cambridge, 1872) – Egypt to South Sudan
 Afraflacilla stridulator Żabka, 1993 – Western Australia
 Afraflacilla tamaricis (Simon, 1885) – North Africa, Israel, Saudi Arabia, Yemen
 Afraflacilla tarajalis Miñano & Tamajón, 2017 – Spain, Portugal, Morocco
 Afraflacilla venustula (Wesołowska & Haddad, 2009) – South Africa
 Afraflacilla vestjensi Żabka, 1993 – Northern Territory
 Afraflacilla wadis (Prószyński, 1989) – Saudi Arabia, Israel, Yemen
 Afraflacilla yeni Żabka, 1993 – Victoria
 Afraflacilla zuluensis (Haddad & Wesołowska, 2013) – South Africa

References 

Salticidae
Salticidae genera
Taxa named by Lucien Berland
Spiders of Africa
Spiders of Asia
Spiders of Australia